Lele may refer to:

Places
Lélé, Cameroon
Lélé River of the Cameroon
Lele, Nepal
 Lele, the Hungarian name for Lelei village, Hodod Commune, Satu Mare County, Romania
Lele, Togo
Lele, an ancient name of Lahaina, Hawaii

Languages
Lele language (Bantu)
Lele people, from the Democratic Republic of the Congo
Lele language (Chad), an Afro-Asiatic language
Lele language (Guinea), a Mande language
Lele language (Papua New Guinea), an Austronesian language
Lyélé language, a Niger–Congo language, also known as Lele
Tiagba language, a Niger–Congo language, also known as Lélé

Individuals
Lelé (1918-2003), Brazilian footballer
Lele (rapper) (1986–2010), Puerto Rican rapper
Lele Forood (born 1956), American college tennis coach
Lele Hardy (born 1988), American basketball player
Lele Marchitelli (born 1955), Italian musician
Lele Pons (born 1996), American internet celebrity
João Filgueiras Lima (1931–2014), Brazilian architect also known as Lelé
Ambrus Lele (born 1958), Hungarian handballer
Ashish Kishore Lele (born 1967), Indian chemical engineer
Boniface Lele (1947–2014), Roman Catholic bishop
Lailatou Amadou Lele (born 1983), Nigerien taekwondo practitioner
Pushkar Lele (born 1979), Hindustani classical vocalist
Ramachandra Datatraya Lele (born 1928), Indian physician
Shrikant Lele (born 1943), Indian metallurgical engineer
William Lele, English Member of Parliament in 1406
Yu Lele (born 1989), Chinese competitor in synchronized swimming
Lele (footballer), Spanish footballer
Lelê (footballer, born 1990), Wesley de Jesus Correia, Brazilian footballer
Lelê (footballer, born 1997), Leanderson da Silva Genésio, Brazilian footballer

Other uses
Lele, Indonesian, Javanese, and Sundanese word for catfish, as in the dish Pecel Lele
Tapu Lele, a generation VII Pokémon species
Lele (mascot), the official mascot of the Nanjing 2014 Summer Youth Olympics
Iso Lele, a car produced by the Italian manufacturer Iso Automoveicoli S.p.A. between 1969 and 1974

See also
Lelu (disambiguation)
Leele (disambiguation)
Fu Niu Lele, the mascot of the 2008 Summer Paralympics in Beijing
 Mr. Lele, an Indian film by Shashank Khaitan scheduled for a 2021 release